The  was an army of the Imperial Japanese Army during the final days of World War II.

History
The Japanese 50th Army was formed on June 19, 1945, under the Japanese 11th Area Army as part of the last desperate defense effort by the Empire of Japan to deter possible landings of Allied forces in the northern prefectures of the Tōhoku region of northern Honshū during Operation Downfall. The Japanese 50th Army was based in Aomori Prefecture and consisted mostly of poorly trained and poorly armed reservists, conscripted students, Volunteer Fighting Corps militia and walking wounded. It was demobilized at the surrender of Japan on August 15, 1945, without having seen combat.

List of Commanders

References

External links

50
Military units and formations established in 1945
Military units and formations disestablished in 1945